The Gazet van Antwerpen (Antwerp Gazette, popularly named De Frut, "sour head cheese") is a Belgian newspaper in Antwerp and Flanders, published by Concentra.

History and profile
Gazet van Antwerpen was established in 1891. Its editor was Jan Baptist Napolitaan Van Os, a Catholic. Shortly afterwards, the company NV De Vlijt took over the newspaper. Circulation rose to 25,000 in 1893 and 40,000 in 1896. Around World War I, its circulation was just short of 100,000. 

In 1973, Gazet van Antwerpen reached its peak of 210,000. The NV De Vlijt merged into the Regionale Uitgeversgroep with Concentra Holding in 1996, the publisher of Het Belang van Limburg which became its sister newspaper. Concentra was listed on the Euronext Brussels until 2004. 

Gazet van Antwerpen is published in tabloid format as its sister paper, Het Belang van Limburg.

Editors
 Jan Baptist Napolitaan Van Os (1891–1893),
 Jan van Kerckhoven (1893–1899)
 Frans Goris (1899–1938)
 Louis Kiebooms (1938–1949)
 Louis Meerts (1949–1985)
 Lou De Clerck (1985–1991)
 Jos Huypens (1991–1996)
 Luc Van Loon (1996–2004)
 Luc Rademakers (2004–2007 )
 Pascal Kerkhove (2007–present)

Circulation

References

External links
 
 Newspapers in the class room 

1891 establishments in Belgium
Dutch-language newspapers published in Belgium
Mass media in Antwerp
Publications established in 1891